Tool Academy 3 is the third (and to date last) installment to Tool Academy. This season was notable for including the series' first female tools (Jennavecia and Courtney), first same-sex couple (Courtney and Cheron), and first married couple (Kevin and Jermika). The show premiered on February 14, 2010. There were 10 contestants.

Lessons of the Week
Badges
  Communication
  Fidelity
  Modesty
  Appreciation
  Maturity
  Trust
  Family Values
  Commitment

Contestants

Episode Progress

 The contestant won Tool Academy.
 The contestant won a challenge and won a date with their partner.
 The contestant won a challenge, won a date with their partner, and was first to receive a badge.
 The contestant was the first to receive a badge.
 The contestant was safe from being eliminated.
 The contestant was at risk of being eliminated.
 The contestant was eliminated and their partner decided to stay with them.
 The contestant was eliminated and their partner decided to leave them.
 The contestant was eliminated and decided to leave their partner.
 The contestant quit the show, and left their partner.
 The contestant and his partner chose to split up and leave outside of elimination.

Episodes

Episode 1
First aired February 14, 2010
Lesson of the Week: Communication
Challenge: Dog House
Challenge Reward: Romantic Dinner
Challenge Winner: Jennavecia, Kyle
Bottom: None
Eliminated: None
Quit: Chasyn
Episode Notes: Chasyn became the first tool to drop out of the Tool Academy because he thought he was better than the program. In return, all the remaining Tools made it through to the next round. Also Angelo was at first the "Ripped Tool", but during therapy he became the "Teary Tool".

Episode 2
First aired February 21, 2010
Lesson of the Week: Fidelity
Challenge: Create A Song And Perform "Tool-e-Oke"
Challenge Reward: Romantic Date
Challenge Winner: Kevin, Jermika
Bottom: Angelo, Shawn, Jennavecia
Eliminated: Shawn (Emily decided to stay with Shawn)

Episode 3
First aired February 28, 2010
Lesson of the Week: Modesty
Challenge: None
Bottom: Daniel, Jacob, Jordan
Eliminated: Daniel (Daniel decided to leave Lesley)

Episode 4
First aired March 14, 2010
Lesson of the Week: Appreciation
Challenge: Create A Dinner Party
Challenge Reward: Conjugal Visit Room
Challenge Winner: Angelo, Dayna
Bottom: Kevin, Courtney
Eliminated: Courtney (Cheron decided to leave Courtney)

Episode 5
First aired March 14, 2010
Lesson of the Week: Maturity
Challenge: Pay Bills
Challenge Reward: Romantic Date, $1,624.25
Challenge Winner: Angelo, Dayna
Quit: Tommy (Tommy and Kate decided to break up and quit) Tommy was sleeping with someone else when he was with Kate
Bottom: Jacob, Jordan
Eliminated: Jordan (Rachel decided to stay with Jordan)

Episode 6
First aired March 21, 2010
Lesson of the Week: Trust
Challenge: Human Lie Detector Test
Helping Their Partners By: Setting Up a Romantic Date
Bottom: Jacob, Kevin
Eliminated: Kevin (Jermika decided to stay with Kevin)

Episode 7
First aired March 28, 2010
Lesson of the Week: Family Values
Special Guests: The Couple's Parents
Challenge: To Take Care of Fake Babies
Bottom 2: Angelo, Jennavecia
Eliminated: Jennavecia (Kyle decided to stay with Jennavecia)
Jennavecia hit Angelo and Dayna.

Episode 8
First aired April 4, 2010
Lesson of the Week: Commitment
Runner Up: Angelo (Dayna decided to stay with Angelo)
Winner: Jacob

Winner
Jacob was the graduate and winner of Tool Academy 3.
Angelo, in his exit interview, felt the decision was wrong and that he wanted to graduate. He correlated the experience as "..the one student who sits there and studies the whole time, and does everything they are supposed to do, and then you have student at the end who just tries to cram everything in the night before, and cheats a little bit."

References

2010 American television seasons